Swati Kapoor is an Indian actress. She made her television debut as Rachana in the serial Kaali – Ek Agnipariksha. She made her debut in films with Punjabi film Mr & Mrs 420.

Filmography

Films

Television

References

External links

21st-century Indian actresses
Living people
Indian television actresses
Actresses in Hindi cinema
Actresses in Punjabi cinema
Year of birth missing (living people)
Actresses in Hindi television
Actors from Mumbai